The Journal of Research Practice is a biannual peer-reviewed open access academic journal covering the philosophy of research. It is published by  Athabasca University Press. Free access is made possible through institutional sponsorships and optional processing fees paid by authors. The editors-in-chief are D. P. Dash (Swinburne University of Technology and Xavier Institute of Management) and Werner Ulrich (University of Fribourg and Open University). The journal is abstracted and indexed in Scopus.

References

External links 
 

Research methods journals
Open access journals
Publications established in 2005
Online-only journals
Biannual journals
Athabasca University
English-language journals
Academic journals associated with universities and colleges